Fred Wain (6 June 1928 – 6 November 2019) was an Australian rules footballer who played with Hawthorn in the Victorian Football League (VFL).

Notes

External links 

1928 births
2019 deaths
Australian rules footballers from Victoria (Australia)
Hawthorn Football Club players